Justiniani is an Italian surname. Notable people with the surname include:

Benedetto Justiniani (1550–1622), Italian Jesuit theologian
Nicholas Justiniani, Italian Benedictine monk and Venetian nobleman
Pablo Justiniani (born 1952), Panamanian weightlifter

Italian-language surnames